Monolistra schottlaenderi is a species of isopod in the family Sphaeromatidae.

The IUCN conservation status of Monolistra schottlaenderi is "VU", vulnerable. The species faces a high risk of endangerment in the medium term. The IUCN status was reviewed in 1996.

References

Sphaeromatidae
Articles created by Qbugbot
Crustaceans described in 1930